A number of French ships of the French Navy have borne the name Alexandre in honour of Alexander the Great:

Ships named Alexandre 
 , an  64-gun ship of the line
 , a brig, formerly the British privateer Alexander
 , a  74-gun ship of the line, was laid down as Alexandre before being renamed.
 Alexandre (1794), formerly HMS Alexander, built in 1778 and captured in the action of 6 November 1794
 , a  80-gun ship of the line, was renamed Alexandre on 5 February 1803.
 , a 90-gun  ship of the line, was started as Alexandre in 1827
 , a 
 , a 90-gun Suffren-class ship of the line

Notes and references

Notes

References

Bibliography 
 

French Navy ship names